Kimberly Marie Matula (born August 23, 1988) is an American actress. She is known for playing Hope Logan on the CBS daytime soap opera The Bold and the Beautiful from 2010 to 2016, and for playing Ronnie on the 2018 Fox comedy series LA to Vegas.

Life and career
Matula was born in Fort Worth, Texas to David and Karin Matula. She is of Norwegian, Czech, English, Sudeten German and French-Canadian ancestry. Matula has always dreamed of acting and created videos of her acting. She studied film at the University of Texas at Arlington, but dropped out because her acting career was taking off. In 2008, Matula appeared in the Lifetime movie Queen Sized, and in next year moved to Los Angeles, then in 2010, she landed the role of Hope Logan in the CBS daytime soap opera The Bold and the Beautiful.

In 2014, Matula was nominated for a Daytime Emmy Award for Outstanding Younger Actress in a Drama Series. In her two final years on the soap, Matula's character had major storylines. In November 2014, it was announced that Matula had not renewed her contract and would be departing the series for a career in primetime television and film.

In 2016, Matula joined the cast of the second season of the critically acclaimed Lifetime dark comedy-drama series, Unreal.

In 2018, Matula had a leading role in the Fox comedy series LA to Vegas.

Filmography

Awards and nominations

References

External links

1988 births
Living people
American people of Czech descent
American people of English descent
American people of French-Canadian descent
American people of German descent
American people of Norwegian descent
American soap opera actresses
American voice actresses
American stage actresses
American television actresses
Actresses from Texas
Actresses from Fort Worth, Texas
21st-century American actresses